Ovrin (also Romanized as Ovrīn, Avarīn, and Orīn) is a village in Hamedanak Rural District, in Bostan District of Baharestan County, Tehran province, Iran. At the 2006 National Census, its population was 9,615 in 2,340 households, when it was in Robat Karim County. The following census in 2011 counted 12,942 people in 3,571 households, by which time the district, together with Golestan District, had been separated from the county and Baharestan County established. The latest census in 2016 showed a population of 17,577 people in 5,180 households; it was the largest village in its rural district.

References 

Baharestan County

Populated places in Tehran Province

Populated places in Baharestan County